AN/TPS is a series of US radars. It includes:

 AN/TPS-1
 AN/TPS-1B
 AN/TPS-1D
 AN/TPS-43
 AN/TPS-44
 AN/TPS-58
 AN/TPS-59
 AN/TPS-70
 AN/TPS-72
 AN/TPS-75
 AN/TPS-80